Megalopyge krugii is a moth of the family Megalopygidae. It was described by Hermann Dewitz in 1897.

Found in Puerto Rico, hundreds may congregate together, and contact with the skin will cause a stinging sensation.

References

Moths described in 1897
Megalopygidae